The Director, Transport Safety, who operates as Transport Safety Victoria, is the independent Government agency responsible for bus and marine safety in the State of Victoria, Australia.  The position was created as a statutory office by the Transport Integration Act 2010 and the office commenced operation on 1 July 2010. The Rail branch of TSV completed transfer to the Office of the National Rail Safety Regulator (ONRSR) in December 2019.

The Director, Transport Safety is one of two dedicated transport safety offices in Victoria, the other being the Chief Investigator, Transport Safety. The Director has oversight of safety regulation schemes and industry performance under the schemes and is responsible for regulation and compliance activities in the transport sector, while the Chief Investigator conducts no blame or just culture investigations and inquiries in the transport sector. These agencies are part of the Department of Transport but are functionally independent and report to the relevant Ministers.

Main responsibilities

Buses 
The Director is also responsible for the safety regulation of bus services in Melbourne and wider Victoria (large public buses are generally operated in Victoria by a wide variety of bus operators under contract with Public Transport Victoria) including mini bus operators. Power is derived from the Bus Safety Act 2009.

Recreational boating 
The Director is the safety regulator of recreational boating in Victoria.  The monitoring of recreational craft covers the regulation of a wide range of vessels including yachts, speedboats, jet skis, canoes and paddle boats. The Director's jurisdiction to regulate boating predominately arises under the Marine Safety Act 2010 although some powers are exercised under delegation founded under Commonwealth legislation. The commercial sector is regulated by the Australian Maritime Safety Authority (AMSA).

Governance

Establishment 

The office of the Director, Transport Safety was established after the passage and commencement of the Transport Integration Act 2010. The office arose from the amalgamation of the offices of the Director, Public Transport Safety and the Director of Marine Safety. This resulted in Victoria's first integrated transport safety administration with multi modal responsibilities in land and water-based transport.

The relevant Minister in the Victorian Parliament put the matter as follows:

"The 2004 TFG International Review of the Role and Accountability Arrangements for Public Transport and Marine Safety in Victoria provided the framework -- implemented by the Rail Safety Act 2006 -- to establish the independent Director, Public Transport Safety, and the Chief Investigator, Transport and Marine Safety Investigations.  However, the Director of Marine Safety has not yet been given this same independence.  The Bill addresses this by merging the Director of Marine Safety and the Director, Public Transport Safety.  This is a significant change, creating a single independent transport safety regulator.  It will provide a more integrated approach to safety regulation, while it is also likely to drive efficiencies by removing unnecessary duplication in systems and processes. "

Transport Integration Act 

The Transport Integration Act provides the Director, Transport Safety with a governance framework - the objects, functions and powers  - which comprise the charter of the office.

Objects 
The Transport Integration Act provides that the primary object of the Director, Transport Safety is to "...independently seek the highest transport safety standards that are reasonably practicable...". Other notable objects of the Director include:

 improving the safety of public transport for public transport users
 ensuring, in collaboration with other transport bodies and public entities, that public transport operates as part of an integrated transport system which seeks to meet the needs of all transport system users
 managing public transport in a manner which supports sustainability by seeking to increase the share of public transport trips as a proportion of all transport trips in Victoria
 seeking to improve the environmental performance of public transport including by minimising its adverse environmental impacts
 contributing to social wellbeing by providing access to opportunities and supporting liveable communities
 promoting economic prosperity through efficient and reliable movement of public transport users.

Functions 
The functions of the Director, Transport Safety include:

 performing functions or duties conferred on the office by the Marine Act 1988, Bus Services Act 1995, and the Transport (Compliance and Miscellaneous) Act 1983 and other relevant Acts and regulations made under those and other relevant Acts
 making recommendations to the Minister about the operation and administration of those Acts and regulations
 advising and making recommendations to the Minister on public transport and related matters
 investigating and reporting on public transport safety matters
 preparing codes of practice and guidelines
 providing guidance and information on safety matters
 promoting education and training
 conducting education and training
 collecting information and data and sponsoring research
 promoting awareness in the transport industry and among the public about transport safety initiatives
 developing operational policy about transport safety regulation
 conducting cost benefit analysis about mandatory transport safety decisions.

Powers 
The Transport Integration Act provides the Director, Transport Safety with a range of general powers which can be exercised in relation to the bus and marine industries. More specific powers are contained in the key statutes administered by the Director, namely the Bus Safety Act 2009 and the Marine Safety Act 1988.  Supporting compliance powers are established in the Transport (Compliance and Miscellaneous) Act 1983 for the bus industry.

The compliance support scheme enables the appointment of authorised officers and confers coercive powers and a range of administrative and court-based sanctions.  The key elements are:

 appointment of officers transport safety officers
 powers relating to entry to premises, inspection, securing sites, use of force and seizure of things
 powers to search, enter and require production of documents and information and to require name and address details
 sanctions and penalties such as improvement notices, prohibition notices and infringement notices
 powers to initiate prosecutions, receive safety undertakings and impose commercial benefits penalty orders, supervisory intervention orders, exclusion orders and adverse publicity orders.

The powers of the Director in the marine sector under the Marine Act 1988 cover many of the areas listed above.

Independence 
The Director is independent of Ministers and Government generally. The Transport Integration Act provides, for example, that the Director "...when performing or exercising his or her functions, is independent and is not subject to the direction and control of the Minister." Independence is supported by provisions requiring that the removal of the Director from office can only occur with the approval of both Houses of Parliament.

Responsibilities under statutory schemes 
Many of the responsibilities of the Director center on monitoring and enforcing industry compliance with safety standards established by legislation. Examples of the Director's responsibilities are set out below.

Bus Safety Act 

The Bus Safety Act 2009 regulates the operation safety of large and small buses in Victoria.  The Act imposes safety duties on bus operators and all others who have a role in providing both commercial and non-commercial bus services.  It does this by -
 providing that an operator or procurer of a bus service "must, so far as is reasonably practicable, ensure the safety of the bus service"
 providing that a bus safety worker "must take reasonable measures to ensure the safety of persons who may be affected by the acts or omissions of the bus safety worker"
 providing that a person who determines the location of a bus stop, or designs, constructs, installs, modifies or maintains a bus stop, "must ensure, so far as is reasonably practicable, that the location, design, construction or condition of the bus stop is safe".

The Act also establishes an accreditation scheme for the operators of larger buses.  Operators of smaller buses or buses not used commercially are subject to a lower impact registration requirement.

Marine Safety Act 
The Marine Safety Act 2010 establishes a range of permissioning schemes for commercial vessels and recreational vessels and their operators and crew.  The Marine Drug, Alcohol and Pollution Control) Act 1988 also establishes a scheme to control drug and alcohol use when in charge of a vessel and provisions prohibiting and controlling marine pollution in Victoria.

See also 

 Buses in Melbourne
 Bus Safety Act
 Transport Integration Act
 Chief Investigator, Transport Safety
 Transport Act 1983
 Transport (Compliance and Miscellaneous) Act 1983

References

External links 
 Transport Safety Victoria website
 Victorian Department of Transport website
 Department of Economic Development, Jobs, Transport and Resources (DEDJTR) website
 Victorian Government website

Public transport in Melbourne
Bus transport in Melbourne
Government agencies of Victoria (Australia)